Walderton is a hamlet in the Chichester district of West Sussex, England. It lies on the B2146 road 4 miles (6.4 km) northeast of Emsworth. It is in the civil parish of Stoughton.

The village lies just below the source of the River Ems. It is crossed by the Monarch's Way long-distance footpath.

External links

Villages in West Sussex